The women's 4 × 100 metres event at the 2013 Asian Athletics Championships was held at the Shree Shiv Chhatrapati Sports Complex on 6 July.

Results

References
Results

100 Women's Relay
Relays at the Asian Athletics Championships
2013 in women's athletics